Dictated Aggression is the fifth full-length studio album from American crossover thrash band, M.O.D. It was released in 1996 on Music For Nations and follows 1994's studio album, Devolution. Blackout Records subsequently re-issued the album with a different cover and enhanced CD content of a live concert in France.

This would be the band's last album until 2003's The Rebel You Love to Hate, although Billy Milano did appear on Bigger Than the Devil – an S.O.D. reunion album in 1999.

Track listing
All songs written by Billy Milano

Enhanced CD content
 Live at Club Bikini, Toulouse, France – September 14, 1993 – 19:42

Personnel 
 Billy Milano – vocals, guitar, bass
 Joe Young – guitar
 Dave Chavarri – drums
 Recorded at Explosive Sound Design, Hoboken, New Jersey, USA
 Produced and engineered by Billy Milano
 Programming, engineered and mixed by Clinton Bradley
 Original cover art by Anthony Ferrara
 Re-issue cover art by Rick Rios

Trivia
 Billy Milano also co-produced Something's Gotta Give, an album by New York hardcore band, Agnostic Front, at the Explosive Sound Design studios in Hoboken, New Jersey
 The first part of the live concert in the enhanced CD content can be found on the Devolution re-issue

References

External links
Blackout Records album page
MOD and SOD official fansite
BNR Metal discography page

1996 albums
M.O.D. albums
Music for Nations albums